Responsibility is a 1962 Argentine film directed by José A. Martínez Suárez and written by David Viñas.

The famous Argentinian comic strip Mafalda's main character is inspired by one of the character of this movie.

Cast

References

External links
 

1962 films
1960s Spanish-language films
Argentine black-and-white films
Argentine drama films
Films directed by José A. Martínez Suárez
1960s Argentine films